Marcus Manlius Capitolinus (died 384 BC) was consul of the Roman Republic in 392 BC. He was the brother of Aulus Manlius Capitolinus, consular tribune five times between 389 and 370 BC. The Manlii were one of the leading patrician gentes that dominated the politics of the early Republic.

Biography 
During the Gallic siege of Rome in 390 BC, the account of which has been greatly mythologized, Marcus Manlius held out on the citadel with a small garrison, while the rest of Rome was abandoned. When Gauls under the command of Brennus attempted to scale the Capitoline, Manlius was roused by the cackling of the sacred geese, rushed to the spot, and threw down the foremost assailants.

After the sack of Rome left the plebeians in pitiful condition, they were forced to borrow large sums of money from the patricians, and  once again became the poor debtor class of Rome. Manlius, the hero of Rome, fought for them. Livy says that he was the first patrician to act as a populist. Seeing a centurion led to prison for debt, he freed him with his own money, and even sold his estate to relieve other poor debtors, while he accused the senate of embezzling public money. He was charged with aspiring to kingly power, and condemned by the comitia, but not until the assembly had adjourned to a place outside the walls, where they could no longer see the Capitol which he had saved. The Senate condemned him to death in 385 BC, and he was thrown from the Tarpeian Rock.

Manlius' house on the Capitoline Hill was razed, and the Senate decreed that no patrician should live there henceforth. The Manlii themselves resolved that no patrician Manlius should bear the name of Marcus. According to Mommsen, the story of the saving of the Capitol was a later invention to justify his cognomen, which may be better explained by his domicile.  Some scholars consider him the second martyr in the cause of social reform at Rome.

Pliny the Elder describes Manlius among his "instances of extreme courage":

The military honours of Manlius Capitolinus would have been no less splendid than [those of Titus Caecilius Denter], if they had not been all effaced at the close of his life. Before his seventeenth year, he had gained two spoils, and was the first of equestrian rank who received a mural crown; he also gained six civic crowns, thirty seven donations, and had twenty-three scars on the fore-part of his body. He saved the life of P. Servilius, the master of the horse, receiving wounds on the same occasion in the shoulders and the thigh. Besides all this, unaided, he saved the Capitol, when it was attacked by the Gauls, and through that, the state itself; a thing that would have been the most glorious act of all, if he had not so saved it, in order that he might, as its king, become its master. But in all matters of this nature, although valour may effect much, fortune does still more.

Notes

References

384 BC deaths
4th-century BC Roman consuls
Capitolinus, Marcus
Year of birth unknown
Roman patricians